{{Infobox person
| image              = Femi Benussi 1972 crop.jpg
| caption            = Femi Benussi in La mala ordina (1972).
| name               = Femi Benussi
| birth_date         = 
| birth_place        = Rovigno, Italian Social Republic (now Rovinj, Croatia)
| death_date         = 
| death_place        = 
| occupation         = Actress
| yearsactive        = 1965–1983
}}

Eufemia "Femi" Benussi (born 4 March 1945) is a Yugoslav-Italian film actress. She appeared in 82 films between 1965 and 1983.

Benussi was born in Rovigno, Italy (now Rovinj, Croatia). She debuted on stage at the Teatro del Popolo of Rijeka, then she moved to Rome and made her film debut at 19 in Il boia scarlatto, with the stage name Femy Martin.  Benussi was mainly active in genre films, and in the seventies she became a star of the commedia sexy all'italiana subgenre.

Selected filmography

 Bloody Pit of Horror (1965)
 The Hawks and the Sparrows (1966)
 Death Walks in Laredo (1966)
 Il tempo degli avvoltoi (1967)
 Born to Kill (1967) 
 Deadly Inheritance (1968) 
 Requiem for a Gringo (1968) 
 Death Knocks Twice (1969)
 Poppea's Hot Nights (1969)
 Tarzana, the Wild Girl (1969)
 Hatchet for the Honeymoon (1970)
 Man of the Year (1971)
 La mala ordina (1972)
 So Sweet, So Dead (1972)
 The Countess Died of Laughter (1973)
 Special Killers (1973)My Pleasure Is Your Pleasure  (1973)
 Il domestico (1974)
 The Sensual Man (1974)
 The Stranger and the Gunfighter (1974)
 The Killer Must Kill Again (1975)
 Nude per l'assassino (1975)
 The Bloodsucker Leads the Dance (1975)
 Private Lessons (1975)
 La novizia (1975)
 Le dolci zie (1975)
 Confessions of a Frustrated Housewife (1976)
 Classe mista (1976)
 Batton Story'' (1976)

References

External links

1945 births
Living people
People from Rovinj
Istrian Italian people
Italian film actresses
20th-century Italian actresses